The Decauville Railway of the Cobazet Estate (French Chemin de fer de la domaine de Cobazet) was a  long narrow-gauge railway with a gauge of  near Mosset in the Pyrénées-Orientales department in southern France.

History 

Baron Fernand Marie de Chefdebien-Zagarrira (1836-1914) acquired the Cobazet Estate at an auction in 1883. It was a very large estate with  near Mosset. In addition to willows and pine, fir and beech forests, there was also a quarry above the Refuge de Caillau. There the foreman Remy Jacomy (1818-1889) had mined talc.

In order to market the soapstone mined in the quarry, he converted it into talc at a chemical factory in Prades in Poudre Chefdebien, which was used to treat vine diseases.

Track construction 

They came from the Tamaris forge in Alès and were either straight or curved. The surveyor calculated the arches of the track so that their length was a multiple of 6 metres. The first rails were delivered in numbered packages at the end of September 1885, to make the assembly as easy as possible, just like with a Meccano set.

The first  of track were laid on 10 October 1885. After a winter-break caused by the first snowfall, laying the section from Caillauet to Canrec began on 14 May 1886. Only one bridge over the Còrrec de Canrec was necessary en route. On 19 June 1886 the route reached the Col des Vigues. However, due to the poor substructure, there were many derailments, so that the route had to be improved.

The Gare d'Estardé was taken out of service in 1916 and sold to the French army. The rest of the network was finally shut down around 1950, when lorries could be used for transport.

Rolling stock
The Decauville locomotive Stéatite, which was bought by the Baron from a third party, found it difficult to pull the empty wagons uphill in the arid area. Funnel-shaped sand boxes attached to the rear of the driver's cab indicate that the locomotive's wheels often spun.

Railway Modeling 
An H0e model of the locomotive was commercially produced by Jouef in 1967.

References 

Railway lines in Occitania (administrative region)
Railway lines opened in 1886
Railway lines closed in 1950
600 mm gauge railways
Decauville